Ervis Çaço (born 26 April 1989 in Berat) is an Albanian footballer who currently for KF Tomori Berat in the Albanian First Division.

References

1989 births
Living people
Sportspeople from Berat
Association football midfielders
Albanian footballers
FK Tomori Berat players
Luftëtari Gjirokastër players
KF Tirana players
Besa Kavajë players
KF Korabi Peshkopi players
Kategoria Superiore players
Kategoria e Parë players